Virtual Global Taskforce (VGT) is a group of law enforcement agencies from around the world who operate together to stop online child sex abuse.

The VGT is made up of the following organisations:
Australian Hi-Tech Crime Centre / Australian Federal Police (AFP)
Child Exploitation and Online Protection Centre (United Kingdom)
Colombian National Police
Cybercrime Coordination Unit Switzerland (CYCO)
Dutch National Police
Europol
Interpol
Italian Postal and Communication Police Service
Korean National Police Agency
Royal Canadian Mounted Police
New Zealand Police
Ministry of Interior for the United Arab Emirates
Philippine National Police
U.S. Immigration and Customs Enforcement (ICE), an investigative arm of the Department of Homeland security.

See also
 Operation Ore

External links
 Virtual Global Taskforce

Anti–child pornography organizations